Coneflower is a common name of several genera of flowering plants:

In the family Asteraceae
Dracopis
Echinacea
Rudbeckia
Ratibida

In the family Proteaceae
 Isopogon

See also
Cornflower